The City of Townsville is a local government area (LGA) located in North Queensland, Australia. It encompasses the city of Townsville, together with the surrounding rural areas, to the south are the communities of Alligator Creek, Woodstock and Reid River, and to the north are Northern Beaches and Paluma, and also included is Magnetic Island. In June 2018 the area had a population of 194,072, and is the 28th-largest LGA in Australia. Townsville is considered to be the unofficial capital of North Queensland.

History
Prior to 2008, the new City of Townsville was an entire area of two previous and distinct local government areas:

 the former City of Townsville;
 and the City of Thuringowa.

The City of Townsville was first established as the Borough of Townsville under the Municipal Institutions Act 1864 on 15 February 1866. The surrounding rural area, which was given the name Thuringowa Division, was established on 11 November 1879 as one of 74 divisions around Queensland under the Divisional Boards Act 1879. On 31 March 1903, Thuringowa Division became the Shire of Thuringowa and Townsville was granted city status under the Local Authorities Act 1902, the ancestor of the current Local Government Act 1993.

The borders of the Townsville municipality were expanded to keep pace with urban growth in 1882, 1918, 1936, 1958 and 1964 – the purpose of expanding the borders was to keep urban and rural administrations separate. This state government convention changed under the Bjelke-Petersen government and the borders between the two local governments became static.  By 1986 the Shire of Thuringowa had grown to a population of 27,000 and was declared a city.

The City of Townsville was notable in Australia in the 1890s and early 1900s for its support for municipal socialism. The anarchist and socialist Alderman Ned Lowry advocated for the City of Townsville to control various industries.

In 1939, Fred Paterson stood successfully as an alderman for the Townsville City Council, becoming the first member of the Communist Party to win such an office in Australia. He was then re-elected in 1943. The same year, he stood for the federal seat of Herbert, but was narrowly defeated. He then contested and won the Bowen seat in the Queensland Parliament, holding it from 1944 until 1950.

From 1942 to 1949, the council was held by a majority of members of the pro-soviet Labor party split, the North Queensland Labor Party.

A succession of endorsed Labor Party mayors and majority councillors held a continuous civic government from 1976–2008, this was the longest continuous Labor administration in the country until Tony Mooney was defeated in 2008.

Following local government reform undertaken by the State Government of Queensland, the City of Townsville and the City of Thuringowa were amalgamated in 2008. The process of amalgamation was completed on the election of a new combined council on 15 March 2008.

Mayors
1866–1867: John Melton Black (first mayor)
1868: William Alfred Ross
 1869: William Aplin
 1870: Frederick Coleman
 1871–1872: Patrick Hanran (total of 7 terms as mayor)
 1873: S. F. Walker
 1874: Joseph Fletcher
 1875: S. F. Walker
 1876: Henry Knapp (briefly)
 1876–1877: Patrick Hanran
 1878: E. A. Head
 1879: Patrick Hanran
 1880–1881: Thankful Percy Willmett (was mayor several times)
 1882: Patrick Hanran
 1883: W.V. Brown
 1883–1884: Thankful Percy Willmett
 1885: Eugene J. Forrest
 1885: Henry Barbenson Le Touzel Hubert
 1886: W.P. Walker
 1887–1888: Arthur Glennie Bundock
 1889: John Newport Parkes
 1890: William Clayton
 1891: Lionel Fairley
 1892: Patrick Hanran
 1892: C.F.A. Sparre
 1893: Patrick Hanran
 1894: Murdo Cameron
 1895: Eugene J. Forrest
 1896: Patrick Hanran
 1897: Michael McKiernan
 1898: A.E. McCreedy
 1899: Thomas Enright
 1900: A.E. McCreedy
 1901: Murdo Cameron
 1902: Thankful Percy Willmett
 1903: William Archer Ackers
 1904: Thomas Smyth 
 1905: Murdo Cameron 
 1906: J. Thompson 
 1907: Peter Minehan 
 1908: G. Murray 
 1909: Thomas Smyth 
 1910: Joseph Hodel
 1911: George Murray
 1912: John Henry Tyack
 1913: Robert Wilson McClelland
 1914–1915: William Henry Swales
 1916: Robert Wilson McClelland
 1917–1918: John Edward Clegg
 1919: Thomas George Melrose
 1920–1923: William Green
1924–1926: Anthony Ogden
 1927–1932: William John Heatley
 1933–1952: John Stewart Mitchell Gill
 1952–1967: Angus J. Smith
 1967–1972: Harold Phillips
 1972–1976: Max Hooper
 1976–1980: Perc Tucker
 1980–1989: Mike Reynolds
 1989–2008: Tony Mooney
 2008–2012: Les Tyrell (previously mayor of the City of Thuringowa)
 2012–present :Jenny Hill

Other notable aldermen include:
 1936–1949 (deputy mayor 1939–1944) Tom Aikens, Member of the Queensland Legislative Assembly for Mundingburra and Townsville South

Townsville City Council
Townsville City Council is the Local Government Authority that services the Local Government Area of Townsville.  The council is represented by 10 councillors and the mayor, who have been elected by the whole city.  The current mayor is Cr Jenny Hill, who was formerly the deputy mayor of the pre-amalgamation City of Townsville in 2007 and early 2008.

The council provides many services to residents of the city of Townsville, including infrastructure, water, garbage, public works, and entertainment and leisure i.e. parks, theatres, events etc.

Civic cabinet 
The current civic cabinet consists of one mayor, elected at large, and 10 councillors, elected from 10 individual divisions.

At the Queensland Local Government election, held on 19 March 2016, Jenny Hill from the centre-left Team Jenny Hill was elected mayor of Townsville, along with 10 other councillors from the same team. No councillors were elected from the rival centre-right Jayne Arlett's team, nor were any independents, effectively creating an undivided council.

In April 2020, Cr Mark Molachino was unanimously appointed deputy mayor.

Towns and localities

Population 
The populations given relate to the component entities prior to 2008. The 2011 census was the first for the new City.

Amenities 
The Townsville City Council operates libraries at Aitkenvale, Townsville City and Thuringowa Central. It also operates a mobile library service, serving the following suburbs on a regular schedule:
 Monday: Deeragun & Bluewater
 Tuesday: Nelly Bay (Magnetic Island), opening hours may be affected by tide times
 Wednesday: Rollingstone & Saunders Beach, fortnightly alternating with Alligator Creek and Oakvale

Sister cities 
  Port Moresby, Papua New Guinea since 1983
  Shunan, Japan since 1990
  Iwaki City, Japan since August 1991
  Changshu, People's Republic of China since 1995
  Suwon, South Korea since 1996
  Foshan, People's Republic of China since 2006

See also 
 List of tautological place names

References

External links 
 
 Townsville community profile (2020)
Population stats of LGA
Townsville Region Social Atlas (2001 Census)

 
Townsville
Local government areas of Queensland
1865 establishments in Australia

ko:타운즈빌